The 56th parallel south is a circle of latitude that is 56 degrees south of the Earth's equatorial plane.  No land lies on the parallel — it crosses nothing but ocean.

At this latitude the sun is visible for 17 hours, 37 minutes during the December solstice and 6 hours, 57 minutes during the June solstice.

Around the world
Starting at the Prime Meridian and heading eastwards, the parallel 56° south passes through:

{| class="wikitable plainrowheaders"
! scope="col" width="125" | Co-ordinates
! scope="col" | Ocean
! scope="col" | Notes
|-
| style="background:#b0e0e6;" | 
! scope="row" style="background:#b0e0e6;" | Atlantic Ocean
| style="background:#b0e0e6;" |
|-
| style="background:#b0e0e6;" | 
! scope="row" style="background:#b0e0e6;" | Indian Ocean
| style="background:#b0e0e6;" |
|-
| style="background:#b0e0e6;" | 
! scope="row" style="background:#b0e0e6;" | Pacific Ocean
| style="background:#b0e0e6;" | Passing just south of Hornos Island (Cape Horn), Passing through the Drake Passage between South America and the Antarctic Peninsula
|-
| style="background:#b0e0e6;" | 
! scope="row" style="background:#b0e0e6;" | Atlantic Ocean
| style="background:#b0e0e6;" | Running through the Scotia Sea.
|}

See also
55th parallel south
57th parallel south

References

s56